Fluminaria is a genus of flowering plants in the family Asteraceae. It has only one currently accepted species, Fluminaria pinifolia, native to Lesotho, and KwaZulu-Natal in South Africa. It prefers to live alongside streams in mountainous areas.

References

Gnaphalieae
Monotypic Asteraceae genera
Flora of Lesotho
Flora of KwaZulu-Natal
Plants described in 2017
Taxa named by N. E. Brown